is a lighthouse on the island of Tomogashima in Wakayama, Wakayama, Japan.

History
The lighthouse was first lit on August 1, 1872.  It was one of the lighthouses designed by Richard Henry Brunton, who was hired by the government of Japan at the start of the Meiji period to help construct lighthouses in Japan to make it safe for foreign ships.

See also

 List of lighthouses in Japan

References

Lighthouses completed in 1872
Lighthouses in Japan
Buildings and structures in Wakayama Prefecture